Emsworth Locks and Dam is a combination of locks and dam on the Ohio River located just downstream of Pittsburgh. The dam has two gated sections, one on each side of Neville Island. There are two locks, one for commercial barge traffic that is 600 feet long by 110 feet wide, and the recreational auxiliary lock that is 360 feet long by 56 feet wide.  Emsworth averages about 470 commercial lock throughs every month and  350-400 lock throughs a month on the recreational auxiliary lock.

See also
 List of locks and dams of the Ohio River
 List of locks and dams of the Upper Mississippi River

References

External links

U.S. Army Corps of Engineers, Pittsburgh District
U.S. Army Corps of Engineers, Huntington District
U.S. Army Corps of Engineers, Louisville District

Dams on the Ohio River
O
Dams completed in 1938
Locks of Pennsylvania
Transportation buildings and structures in Allegheny County, Pennsylvania
Buildings and structures in Allegheny County, Pennsylvania
United States Army Corps of Engineers, Pittsburgh District